e.Republic, Inc. is a Folsom, California-based research and media company. It publishes Government Technology Magazine, a publication covering the role of information technology in state and local government, along with three other publications. e.Republic focuses on connecting private IT companies with government and education agencies. e.Republic organizes 100+ events each year for government and education IT officials.

e.Republic was formed by Robert "Bob" Graves and Dennis McKenna. Cathilea Robinett is CEO, Dennis McKenna is Executive Chairman, Alan Cox is Executive Vice President.

In November 2009, the company purchased Governing Magazine from the Times Publishing Group.  The company maintains multiple publications, platforms, and brands including:

 Industry Navigator
 The Center for Digital Government
 The Center for Digital Education
 The Digital States Survey
 The Digital Cities Survey
 The Digital Counties Survey
 Government Experience Awards
 GovTech (Government Technology)
 Governing
 Industry Insider California
 Industry Insider Texas
 Emergency Management
 Public CIO
 Converge (discontinued)

Company's Connection to Scientology 
Nearly all of e.Republic's owners and upper management, and many other employees, are Scientologists. e.Republic has previously been listed in the WISE Directory and used Scientology materials and methods in its business. Founder and former CEO Dennis McKenna was a Scientology spokesperson during Operation Freakout in the 1970s to frame author Paulette Cooper as a terrorist. 

 In 2001, Sacramento News & Review wrote an article titled "Scientology Inc." describing how "publishing executives in Folsom are spreading the word on technology in government. Some employees say it's actually the words of L. Ron Hubbard that are being spread."  The article describes employees being given Scientology materials and required to take courses on them. The article also describes alleged retribution for non-Scientologist employees.
 In 2006, the Baton Rouge Advocate published an article describing how current CEO Cathilea Robinett brought the mayor-president of East Baton Rouge Parish to a Scientology Gala in 2004. At the gala, the mayor-president secured a $40,000 donation for a local middle school from individuals including John Travolta, Kelly Preston, Isaac Hayes, and Anne Archer.  
 In 2009, The New York Times wrote an article describing concern over the company's purchase of Governing Magazine. 
 In 2018, the Tampa Bay Times published an article describing that "the chairman of the group backing Clearwater's Nov. 6 strong mayor referendum began a job this month with a company owned by a prominent Church of Scientology donor that focuses on local and state government education." The article explores the link between Scientology and a referendum in Clearwater. 
 In March 2021, The Daily Beast published an article in which current and former employees "reveal how the media firm e.Republic was not only run by Scientologist execs but that they employed ruthless Scientology management principles."

References

External links

 Official website

Organizations based in California
Scientology organizations
Folsom, California
American companies established in 1984